Calamandrana is a comune (municipality) in the Province of Asti in the Italian region Piedmont, located about  southeast of Turin and about  southeast of Asti.

Calamandrana borders the following municipalities: Canelli, Cassinasco, Castel Boglione, Nizza Monferrato, Rocchetta Palafea, and San Marzano Oliveto.

People
Giulio Cesare Cordara (1704–1785), historian and writer.

Twin towns — sister cities
Calamandrana is twinned with:

  Kisapostag, Hungary

References

External links
 Official website

Cities and towns in Piedmont